Miroslav Bajgar (born 3 February 1958 in Bílovec) is a Czech former handball player who competed in the 1988 Summer Olympics.

References

1958 births
Living people
Czech male handball players
Olympic handball players of Czechoslovakia
Handball players at the 1988 Summer Olympics
Czechoslovak male handball players
People from Bílovec
Sportspeople from the Moravian-Silesian Region